Sam Reid (born 19 February 1987) is an Australian actor. He is known for his work in Hatfields & McCoys (2012), Belle (2013), '71 (2014), The Astronaut Wives Club (2015), Despite the Falling Snow (2016), Prime Suspect 1973 (2017), The Hunting (2019) and as Lestat de Lioncourt in Anne Rice's Interview with the Vampire (2022–present). His performance in the lattermost received widespread critical acclaim. He was nominated twice for the AACTA Award for Best Lead Actor in a Television Drama for Lambs of God (2019) and The Newsreader (2021–present).

Early life and education
Reid was born on 19 February 1987 in rural New South Wales, Australia, where his father was a cattle farmer. His mother's family is Irish. He has an older brother, Rupert Reid, who is also an actor, and a sister Kali, a producer. 

He attended Cranbrook School, a private boys' school in Sydney. Upon completion of school, Reid briefly lived in New York City before moving to London to study acting. In 2010, he graduated from the London Academy of Music and Dramatic Art (LAMDA).

Career
During his final semester at LAMDA, Reid was given an opportunity to audition for a part in Anonymous (2011). Despite not receiving a script prior to his audition, he was offered the role of the Earl of Essex the next day. He was at this time credited as Sebastian Reid.

In 2012, Reid was cast as the male lead opposite Gugu Mbatha-Raw in the period drama Belle after actor Sam Claflin left the project due to scheduling conflicts.

In February 2016, he appeared in Flume's music video for his song "Never Be Like You" alongside Sophie Lowe.

In 2019, Reid appeared in the Australian web television series Bloom, the subscription television series Lambs of God, and SBS TV drama mini-series The Hunting.

In 2021, Reid was cast as Lestat de Lioncourt in the AMC television series Interview with the Vampire. The series premiered on 2 October 2022 and Reid's performance garnered widespread critical acclaim.

Reid played up-and-coming news presenter Dale Jennings in the ABC series The Newsreader, released in August 2021.

Acting credits

Film

Television

Music video

Stage

Awards and nominations

Notes

References

External links
 

1987 births
Alumni of the London Academy of Music and Dramatic Art
Australian male film actors
Living people
Australian male television actors
People educated at Cranbrook School, Sydney
Male actors from New South Wales